The 1859 Newfoundland general election was held in 1859 to elect members of the 7th General Assembly of Newfoundland in Newfoundland Colony. 18 Liberals and 12 Conservatives were elected. The Liberal Party led by John Kent formed the government.

Results by party

Elected members
 Twillingate-Fogo
 William V. Whiteway Conservative
 Thomas Knight
 Bonavista Bay
 Stephen March
 John H. Warren Conservative
 M. W. Walbank
 Trinity Bay
 F.B.T. Carter Conservative (speaker)
 Stephen Rendell Conservative
 John Winter
 Bay de Verde
 John Bemister Conservative
 Carbonear
 Edmund Hanrahan Liberal
 Harbour Grace
 John Hayward Conservative
 James L. Prendergast Liberal
 election overturned because of alleged intimidation; Prendergast elected in 1860 by-election
 Brigus-Port de Grave
 John Leamon
 St. John's East
 John Kent Liberal
 John Kavanagh
 Robert J. Parsons Liberal
 St. John's West
 John Casey
 Thomas S. Dwyer
 P.M. Barron
 Harbour Main
 Patrick Nowlan Liberal
 Charles Furey Liberal
 Ferryland
 Thomas Glen Conservative
 E. D. Shea Liberal
 Placentia and St. Mary's
 George J. Hogsett Liberal
 John English
 John Delaney
 Richard McGrath, elected in 1860
 Burin
 Ambrose Shea Liberal (speaker)
 James J. Rogerson Liberal
 Fortune Bay
 Robert Carter Conservative
 Burgeo-LaPoile
 James Seaton
 Hugh Hoyles Conservative, elected in 1860

References 
 

1859
1859 elections in North America
1859 elections in Canada
Pre-Confederation Newfoundland
1859 in Newfoundland